NGC 4013 is an edge-on barred spiral galaxy about 55 million light-years away in the constellation Ursa Major. The disk of NGC 4013 shows a distinct "peanut"-shaped bulge in long exposure photographs that N-body computer simulations suggest is consistent with a stellar bar seen perpendicular to the line of sight.

A recent deep color  image of NGC 4013 revealed a looping tidal stream of stars extending over 80 thousand light-years from the Galactic Center.  This structure is thought to be the remnants of a smaller galaxy that was torn apart by tidal forces as it collided with NGC 4013.

Supernova SN 1989Z was discovered on December 30, 1989 at apparent magnitude 12.

NGC 4013 is a member of the Ursa Major Cluster.

See also
 Cigar Galaxy

References

External links
 
 The Discovery of a Giant Stellar Tidal Stream Around NGC4013
 HubbleSite NewsCenter: A Galaxy on the Edge
 

Barred spiral galaxies
Ursa Major (constellation)
Ursa Major Cluster
4013
06963
37691
Astronomical objects discovered in 1788